The 2012–13 Cypriot First Division was the 74th season of the Cypriot top-level football league. It began on 1 September 2012 and ended on 19 May 2013. AEL Limassol were the defending champions. APOEL won the championship two matchweeks before the end of the season.

The league comprise eleven teams from the 2011–12 season and three promoted teams from the 2011–12 Second Division.

Teams
Ermis Aradippou and Anagennisi Dherynia were relegated at the end of the first stage of the 2011–12 season after finishing in the bottom two places of the table. They were joined by Aris Limassol, who finished at the bottom of the second-phase Group C.

The relegated teams were replaced by 2011–12 Second Division champions Doxa Katokopias, runners-up Ayia Napa and third-placed team AEP Paphos.

Personnel and kits

Note: Flags indicate national team as has been defined under FIFA eligibility rules. Players and Managers may hold more than one non-FIFA nationality.

Managerial changes

First phase

League table

Results

Second round

Group A

Table

Results

Group B

Table

Results

Group C

Table

Results

Relegation play-offs
The 11th-placed team Nea Salamina faced 4th-placed 2012–13 Cypriot Second Division side Anagennisi Dherynia, in a single-legged play-off for one spot in the 2013–14 Cypriot First Division. The match was held at Antonis Papadopoulos Stadium on 23 May 2013 and Nea Salamina won by 3–0, retaining its Cypriot First Division spot for the 2013–14 season.

Season statistics

Top scorers
Including matches played on 19 May 2013; Source: Cyprus Football Association

Hat-tricks

Scoring
First goal of the season: 25 minutes –  Juliano Spadacio (Anorthosis) against AEP Paphos (19:25 EET, 1 September 2012)
Fastest goal of the season: 15 seconds –  Mario Budimir (APOEL) against Alki (22 September 2012)
Latest goal of the season: 102 minutes and 23 seconds –  Jan Rezek (Anorthosis) against Omonia (21 October 2012)
First own goal of the season: 49 minutes –  Fabeta (Ayia Napa) for Omonia (20:04 EET, 2 September 2012)
First scored penalty kick of the season: 84 minutes –  Freddy (Omonia) against Ayia Napa (20:39 EET, 2 September 2012)
Most scored goals in a single fixture – 38 goals (Fixture 26)
Fixture 26 results: Enosis 1–2 AEL,  AEP Paphos 0–5 Olympiakos, Omonia 6–0 Nea Salamina, Alki 6–5 Ethnikos, Apollon 2–1 Ayia Napa, Doxa 2–6 AEK, Anorthosis 0–2 APOEL.
 Highest scoring game: 11 goals
Alki 6–5 Ethnikos (30 March 2013)
 Largest winning margin: 6 goals
APOEL 6–0 AEP Paphos (17 March 2013)
Omonia 6–0 Nea Salamina (30 March 2013)
 Most goals scored in a match by a single team: 6 goals
APOEL 6–0 AEP Paphos (17 March 2013)
Omonia 6–0 Nea Salamina (30 March 2013)
Alki 6–5 Ethnikos (30 March 2013)
Doxa 2–6 AEK (31 March 2013)
 Most goals scored by a losing team: 5 goals
Alki 6–5 Ethnikos (30 March 2013)

Discipline
 First yellow card of the season:  Gora Tall for AEP Paphos against Anorthosis, 15 minutes (19:15 EET, 1 September 2012)
 First red card of the season:  Kyriacos Polykarpou for Olympiakos against Nea Salamina, 37 minutes (20:37 EET, 1 September 2012)
 Most yellow cards in a single match: 13
 Anorthosis 1–1 AEL – 6 for Anorthosis (Dan Alexa, Paulo Jorge, Valentinos Sielis (2), Jurgen Colin, Giannis Skopelitis) and 7 for AEL (Dosa Júnior, Marco Airosa, Luciano Bebê, Carlitos, Dédé (2), Ebo Andoh) (1 December 2012)
 Most red cards in a single match: 3
 AEL 3–2 Apollon – 1 for AEL (Edwin Ouon) and 2 for Apollon (Sebastián Setti, Giorgos Vasiliou) (5 January 2013)

References

Sources

Cypriot First Division seasons
Cyprus
1